All the Fun of the Fair is a 2008 jukebox musical with a book by Jon Conway, based on the songs of David Essex. The title of the musical is taken from David Essex's 1975 album All the Fun of the Fair. 

The show had an initial provincial run in the UK in 2008. The show transferred to the Garrick Theatre in the West End in April 2010 for a limited season which concluded in September 2010. It toured again in late 2011.

Synopsis
The show follows Levi Lee, a recently widowed father with a rebellious teenage son, Jack. Levi owns a fairground, and struggles to make ends meet. One of the fairground's residents, a Romani fortune teller, named Rosa, is in love with Levi and tells him there is danger and mysticism in his future. Jack, meanwhile, falls in love with Alice, the daughter of Harvey, an unscrupulous businessman. Harvey sends a group of thugs to run the fair out of town.

Productions

2008 Tour 
The 2008 tour, which ran from September 2008 until May 2009, visited Cardiff, Nottingham, Wimbledon, Milton Keynes, Plymouth, Norwich, Belfast, Birmingham, Hull, Sunderland, Southampton, Liverpool, High Wycombe, Swansea, Northampton, Llandudno and Bristol.

2011 UK national tour
The show is directed by Nikolai Foster, set and costumes by Ian Westbrook, lighting by Ben Cracknell, sound by Steve Jonas, musical staging/assistant director Drew McOnie, musical arranger/studio production Ian Wherry, musical supervisor Olly Ashmore, and magical creative
consultants The Twins. The cast consisted of David Essex (Levi), Louise English (Rosa), David Burrows (Harvey), Rob Compton (Jack), Tim Newman (Jonny), Susan Hallam Wright (Mary), Tanya Robb (Alice), Barry Bloxham (Druid), Susan Hall (Sally), James Hill (Spiv), Gareth Leighton (Chris), Louise Lenihan (Rita), Luke Baker (Chris), and Edie Campbell (Laura).

Musical numbers

 A Winter's Tale - Rosa
 All the Fun of the Fair - Levi and Company
 He Noticed Me - Alice and Mary
 Here We Are All Together - Company
 Hold Me Close - Jack and Company
 Pretty Thing - Jack and Alice
 Rock On - Levi and Harvey
 Me And My Girl (Nightclubbing) - Jack, Jonny and Company
 Street Fight - Harvey and Druid
 Gonna Make You a Star - Company
 Father And Son - Levi and Jack
 You're In My Heart - Levi, Rosa, Jack, Alice and Mary
 Lamplight - Jack
 Stay Young And Free - Harvey and Alice
 She's Leaving - Jonny, Levi, Harvey and Company
 If I Could - Jack and Alice
 Dangerous - Levi, Mary and Company
Silver Dream Machine - Jack, Jonny and Levi
 It's Gonna Be Alright - Levi
 Here We Are All Together (Reprise) - Levi and Company

Reception 
The show received criticism for its book, as critics felt the plot was convoluted in order to shoehorn in Essex's songs.

References

External links
 Official website

Jukebox musicals
2008 musicals
British musicals
West End musicals